Mahfoozur Rahman Nami (May 1911 – 17 November 1963) was an Indian Muslim scholar, politician and an author.

Born in May 1911, Nami was an alumnus of Jamia Miftahul Uloom and Darul Uloom Deoband. He established Madrasa Nūr-ul-Ulūm and Azad Inter College in Bahraich. He died on 17 November 1963.

Biography
Nami was born in May 1911. He completed his primary studies at Jamia Miftahul Uloom with Abul Lateef Nomani and Habib al-Rahman al-'Azmi. Nami entered the Darul Uloom Deoband 1344 AH, where he studied with Hussain Ahmad Madani, Izaz Ali Amrohi and Ibrahim Balyawi. He graduated in  1348 AH.

Nami established Madrasa Nūr-ul-Ulum in Bahraich. He also established Maulana Azad Nur-ul-Ulūm High School, now known as Azad Inter College, in Bahraich. He contested the 1946 Indian provincial elections on the ticket of Indian National Congress. He served as the member of Uttar Pradesh Legislative Assembly from 1946 to 1951. He was the Parliamentary secretary in the Ministry of Education. In 1359 AH, Darul Uloom Deoband nominated him as a court member of Aligarh Muslim University along with Muhammad Tayyib Qasmi and Hifzur Rahman Seoharwi.

Nami died on 17 November 1963 in Bahraich and was buried near the grave of Shah Naeemullah Bahraichi.

Literary works
Nani authored Miftah al-Quran, which has been adopted by Darul Uloom Azaadville, an Islamic seminary in Azaadville, in their curriculum. His other works include:
Muallim ul Quran
Rahmani Qiada
Hilal Bagh
 Musalmanan-E-Hind ka Taleemi Masla

References

Bibliography

1911 births
1963 deaths
People from Bahraich
Darul Uloom Deoband alumni
Muslim writers
Founders of Indian schools and colleges
Indian independence activists from Uttar Pradesh
20th-century Indian scholars
Indian National Congress politicians from Uttar Pradesh
Deobandis